Inter Nashville FC is an amateur soccer team based in Nashville suburb of Antioch, Tennessee. They began play in the National Premier Soccer League in May 2017.

History 

Inter Nashville FC's roots begin in 2010, when club owner, Pedro Reyes purchased a parcel of land in Antioch, Tennessee to construct his first soccer facility. During that time, Reyes created a youth and local soccer setup known as Inter Nashville, alluding to the international culture of the city. By 2011, INFC created its first youth and adult league programs and assembled its first travel soccer program in 2014. On November 18, 2016, it was announced in conjuncture with Richard Askey and Jomo Cromwell, INFC bought a franchise for the National Premier Soccer League and begin to field a senior men's team in 2017.

Honors 
NPSL Southeast Conference Champion: 2017

Staff

References 

Association football clubs established in 2016
Sports in Nashville, Tennessee
Soccer clubs in Tennessee
National Premier Soccer League teams
2016 establishments in Tennessee
Davidson County, Tennessee